Haleem Khan is an Indian Kuchipudi dancer, performer and movie actor, born on 10 April from Ongole of Andhra Pradesh and presently lives in Hyderabad. Haleem has performed more than 800 dance shows across the world, as well conducted Kuchipudi workshops overseas. Haleem specializes in Rupanurupam (female impersonation) within Kuchipudi; he is well known for his performance of Bhama Kalapam  and various roles in Annamacharya kirtanas. Hailing from a Muslim family in a small town, Haleem had faced many difficulties in learning Kuchipudi without his family knowing of it. Initially Haleem had performed under the stage name of Hari. His dance, specially the female impersonation has given him a critical acclaim and won him many awards and felicitations. Haleem is very passionate about preserving the art and is working on an interactive 
Kuchipudi dance instruction video.

Right from his childhood days, classical dance form of Kuchipudi fascinated him and movies were his primary source of inspiration. Long before he fully comprehended the obstacles that had to be faced, he had set his goals to pursue learning Kuchipudi. He was blessed to find his guru, Shri Kaza Venkata Subramanyam garu, who spotted divine grace in him and gave guidance to his passion.

The Passion, innovation and excellence of dance is ingrained in him, Innovation can be seen in many of his performances where he intertwined poetry and music (both English and Urdu) with dance, fused ballet with Kuchipudi. He can effortlessly bring out the aggression of Lord Shiva as he does the Tandavam, or can take the audience inside a woman's heart who is romancing her man through his Javali.

As he is a natural performing artist. He acted in films successfully, he has been passionate in looking at a broad canvas. To look inside the psyche of his artistic nature, and what drives him, is perhaps the innate desire to, in many ways preserve the ancient dance form, where dance cannot reach many due to the pressures of modern-day life, constraints in access to resources; he produced a sophisticated Dance Instructional DVD. He has taken upon himself the shades and nuances to hold on to and propagate the ancient tradition when female dancers did not take to the stage, and female impersonation was popular; He is one among the few male dancers who can don the female role effortlessly leaving the audience mesmerized. The jigsaw puzzle fits—his passion as a male dancer to preserve and propagate his centuries old dance form.

Ambition has no end, and he has been blessed by many gurus and very senior artists and veterans, that he will go a long way. The sky is the only limit for a passionate dancer.

He debuted in Telugu movies with Nuvvila which has performed well at the box office.

Films
Khan has also acted in Telugu films since 2011; his films include:
Nuvvila
Action 3D
Saradaga Ammayitho
Prema gima janta nai
Adavi Kachina Vennela
Nuvvu nenu okatavdam
Srinilayam
Ame Atadaite
Shiva Naga shooting in progress

References

Khaleejtimes.com

Newindianexpress.com

Thehindu.com

Indiaglitz.com

Tribuneindia.com

Times of India

http://www.khaleejtimes.com/international/india/haleem-khans-affair-with-kuchipudi-dance

http://www.mpositive.in/tag/haleem-khan-kuchipudi-dancer/

http://www.ap7am.com/lv-205317-harish-rao-releases-haleem-khans-kuchipudi-dance-dvd.html

External links

 Year of birth missing (living people)
 Living people
 Kuchipudi exponents
 Female impersonators
 Indian male film actors
 People from Ongole
 Telugu male actors